Bełek  is a village in the administrative district of Gmina Nowe Miasto nad Pilicą, within Grójec County, Masovian Voivodeship, in east-central Poland. The , a tributary of the Pilica, flows through the village. In 2021, the total population of the village was 78.

References

Villages in Grójec County